Euler–Boole summation is a method for summing alternating series based on Euler's polynomials, which are defined by

 

The concept is named after Leonhard Euler and George Boole.

The periodic Euler functions are

The Euler–Boole formula to sum alternating series is

 

References 
Jonathan M. Borwein, Neil J. Calkin, Dante Manna: Euler–Boole Summation Revisited. The American Mathematical Monthly, Vol. 116, No. 5 (May, 2009), pp. 387–412 (online, JSTOR)
Nico M. Temme: Special Functions: An Introduction to the Classical Functions of Mathematical Physics. Wiley, 2011, pp. 17–18

Mathematical series
Summability methods